Gilbert George Wooley (1 August 1896 – 8 February 1953) was an English cricketer. He played in a single first-class cricket game for Gloucestershire in 1920, but failed to score in either of his two innings.

References

1896 births
1953 deaths
English cricketers
Gloucestershire cricketers
Sportspeople from Cheltenham